The 1900–01 season was the seventh in the history of the Southern League. Southampton were Division One champions for the fourth time in five seasons, whilst Bristol City were the only Southern League team applied for election. Finally they were elected to the Football League.

Division One

A total of 16 teams contest the division, including 13 sides from previous season and three new teams.

Team promoted from Division Two:
 Watford
Newly elected teams:
 Luton Town - relegated from 1899–1900 Football League
 Kettering - promoted as Midland League champions

Division Two

A total of nine teams contest the division, including 8 sides from previous season and one new team.

Team relegated from Division One:
 Sheppey United

Promotion-relegation test matches
At the end of the season, test matches were held between the bottom two clubs in Division One and the top two clubs in Division Two. Both matches resulted in 0-0 draws, and both Division One teams retained their places in the top division. However, although Brentford were promoted, Grays United were not after refusing to play extra-time in their match against Watford.

Football League elections
Only one Southern League club, Bristol City, applied for election to Division Two of the Football League. They were successful after finishing in second place in the ballot.

References

External links 
Southern League First Division Tables at RSSSF
Southern League Second Division Tables at RSSSF

1900-01
1900–01 in English association football leagues